Barre Circle is a small neighborhood in Baltimore, Maryland, United States. It is often considered to be a part of Pigtown. Most of the neighborhood's historic homes range from 1840 to 1890, with many populated by graduate students at the nearby University of Maryland's Baltimore campus. It is walking distance to the Inner Harbor and the MARC Train's Camden Station.

According to the LiveBaltimore website, Barre Circle is frequently referred to as "Little Georgetown."

It was listed on the National Register of Historic Places in 1983.

References

External links
Barre Circle on LiveBaltimore
, including photo from 1984, at Maryland Historical Trust
Boundary Map of the Barre Circle Historic District, Baltimore City

Neighborhoods in Baltimore
Historic districts on the National Register of Historic Places in Baltimore
Pigtown, Baltimore